As of 2013, Russia is the world's second-largest producer of natural gas, producing an estimated more than 669 billion cubic meters (bcm) of gas a year, and the world's largest natural gas exporter, shipping an estimated 196 bcm a year.

According to The World Factbook estimate, the country also has the largest proven reserves (48 trillion cubic meters (tcm)).  OPEC figures also place Russia first, with an estimated 49 tcm, 24% of the world's proved reserves; however, BP estimates put Russia second behind Iran with 33 tcm. Additionally, Russia is likely to have the largest volume of undiscovered natural gas deposits, an additional 6.7 tcm, according to US Geological Survey estimations. Russia consumes approximately 457 bcm a year, second only to the United States.

Disputes with Ukraine

Since 2005, the Russian gas supplier Gazprom and the Ukrainian oil and gas company Naftogaz have been involved in a number of disputes.  These disputes have grown beyond simple business disputes into transnational political issues that threaten natural gas supplies in numerous European countries dependent on natural gas imports from Russian suppliers, which are transported through Ukraine.

During 2005, Russia claimed Ukraine was not paying for gas, but diverting that which was intended to be exported to the EU from the pipelines. Ukrainian officials at first denied the accusation, but later Naftogaz admitted that natural gas intended for other European countries was retained and used for domestic needs. The dispute reached a peak on 1 January 2006, when Russia cut off all gas supplies passing through Ukrainian territory. On 4 January 2006, a preliminary agreement between Russia and Ukraine was achieved, and the supply was restored. The situation calmed until October 2007 when new disputes began over Ukrainian gas debts. This led to reduction of gas supplies in March 2008. During the last months of 2008, relations once again became tense when Ukraine and Russia could not agree on the debts owed by Ukraine.

In January 2009, this disagreement resulted in supply disruptions in many European nations, with eighteen European countries reporting major drops in or complete cut-offs of their gas supplies transported through Ukraine from Russia. In September 2009 officials from both countries stated they felt the situation was under control and that there would be no more conflicts over the topic, at least until the Ukrainian 2010 presidential elections. However, in October 2009, another disagreement arose about the amount of gas Ukraine would import from Russia in 2010. Ukraine intended to import less gas in 2010 as a result of reduced industry needs because of its economic recession; however, Gazprom insisted that Ukraine fulfill its contractual obligations and purchase the previously agreed upon quantities of gas.

On 8 June 2010, a Stockholm court of arbitration ruled Naftogaz of Ukraine must return  of gas to RosUkrEnergo, a Swiss-based company in which Gazprom controls a 50% stake. Russia accused the  Ukrainian side of siphoning gas from pipelines passing through Ukraine in 2009. Several high-ranking Ukrainian officials stated the return "would not be quick".

In 2022, following the Russian invasion of Ukraine on February 24, 2022, the European Union launched a series of financial sanctions against Russia's energy sector, including its gas industry.

Agreement with China
On 21 May 2014, Russia and China announced an agreement between state controlled gas companies Gazprom and China National Petroleum Corporation after a decade of negotiations.  Under the agreement, Russia will supply China 38 billion cubic meters of natural gas each year for 30 years, starting in 2018.  Both countries will be responsible for building new infrastructure to make the transport possible.  Russia will spend about US$55 billion to build a pipeline from Siberia to Vladivostok, while China will spend $20 billion on infrastructure within its borders. The Kovykta and Chayanda gas fields which will supply the majority of the natural gas are currently largely undeveloped.

Tentative agreements had been reached several times since 2005, but each time final negotiations broke down over price. The agreed upon price was not disclosed, but those familiar with the situation said getting a lower price than European buyers was a key demand of China in the negotiations. However, Russian representatives said the price would fluctuate based on the market price of oil, making the deal closer to what Russia had wanted than to what China had been asking for. The total value of the deal was estimated at US$400 billion. It will increase Russian exports to countries not part of the former Soviet Union by 25% and make China the country's 2nd largest customer, after Germany.

The agreement was reached as Chinese and Russian leaders met to discuss greater cooperation in Asia without involvement of Western powers. It was seen as an important political and economic victory for Russian President Vladimir Putin. It allows Russia to diversify its natural business outside of Europe and weakens the force of economic sanctions placed by the West in the aftermath of the 2014 Crimean crisis. More generally, it allows Russia to reduce its isolation due to its crisis in Ukraine. For China, the deal helps lessen its dependence on coal to produce electric power, using a relatively less-polluting method of electricity generation through natural gas. It also helps meet the country's growing demand for natural gas.

Subsidies 
There is a long history of subsidy of natural gas in Russia. Subsidies for natural gas has been one of the reasons for the limited growth of renewable energy in the country. However, it is difficult to estimate the extent of subsidy, as there is no benchmark price. Often netback calculations have been used, but there are arguments against their validity in determining the size of domestic subsidies. "Netback" is the price that Russian gas is sold for at the border, minus the cost of transportation and taxes imposed on exports. However, it is not certain that the domestic price should be the same as the price obtained at the border. The alternative would be to look at the supply chain for natural gas, identify any losses incurred and classify these as indirect subsidies. However, due to the complexity of the supply chain (including upstream operations, trunk pipelines, distribution grid and local utilities - sometimes owned by commercial entities, sometimes by municipalities or other authorities), it is difficult to identify the size of financial losses.

Automotive use

The use of natural gas cars in Russia is encouraged by the government. Aftermarket conversion kits are sold by companies like Italgas, while some GAZ Group vehicles are sold with natural gas systems. As of late 2016, Gazprom has a network of 254 filling stations in the country, with plans to reach 500 stations by 2020. The NEFAZ bus manufacturing company makes gas-powered buses using Daimler engines. A natural gas variant of the Lada Vesta was introduced in 2017.

Effect on Russian natural gas during war with Ukraine

The 2022 Russian invasion of Ukraine, as the latest part of the Russo-Ukrainian War, caused the weaponising of natural gas, which Russia tried to use to stop Western European countries from providing support to Ukraine. Threatening and then actually restricting gas supplies to Western Europe countries resulted in Nord Stream 2 not starting operations, was followed by a number of gas pipelines from Russia in the Baltic being sabotaged on 26 September 2022. Sanctions on Russian banks making it hard for Gazprom to receive money from international sales which in 2022 fell 45.5% to 100.9bcm. Germany, previously the main purchaser of Russian gas ceased imports by December 2022, as had most of the EU countries. Production of Russian gas in 2022 was 20% lower than in 2021 and it is likely to be years before Russia will find alternative buyers for the lost EU market.

See also

References